Hiromi Nagano (born 20 July 1971) is a Japanese former professional tennis player.

Nagano reached a best singles ranking of 153 and appeared in the main draw of the 1995 Australian Open, as a qualifier. In doubles she was ranked as high as 90 in the world and featured in all four grand slam main draws during her career.

ITF finals

Singles: 4 (1–3)

Doubles: 3 (1–2)

References

External links
 
 

1971 births
Living people
Japanese female tennis players
20th-century Japanese women
21st-century Japanese women